Shahrak-e Malekabad (also Romanized as Shahrak-e Malekābād) is a village in Forg Rural District, Forg District, Darab County, Fars Province, Iran. At the 2006 census, its population was 475, in 91 families.

References 

Populated places in Darab County